Musotima ochropteralis is a moth of the family Crambidae. It was described by Achille Guenée in 1854 and is known from all of Australia. This species has been introduced to New Zealand.

Adults are brown with various markings, including a prominent white comma-shaped spot outlined in black on each forewing.

The larvae feed on Adiantum aethiopicum.

References

Musotiminae
Moths described in 1854